The Highlights is the second greatest hits album (and first released globally) by Canadian singer the Weeknd. It was released on February 5, 2021, and follows the release of his fourth studio album After Hours (2020) and his first greatest hits album The Weeknd in Japan (2018). It was released in anticipation of his performance at the Super Bowl LV halftime show. The track list is composed of songs from his three Billboard 200 number one studio albums: Beauty Behind the Madness (2015), Starboy (2016), and After Hours (2020), his debut mixtape House of Balloons (2011), his EP My Dear Melancholy (2018), and his two co-lead collaborations "Love Me Harder" and "Pray for Me", with Ariana Grande and Kendrick Lamar respectively, from the albums My Everything (2014) and Black Panther: The Album (2018).

Artwork
The album's cover continues the usage of the red suit that The Weeknd donned throughout the promotional material for his fourth studio album After Hours (2020). The particular suit worn in the cover art is the same one that he wore in the music video for the song "Save Your Tears", which served as the fourth single from the aforementioned album.

Commercial performance 
The Highlights debuted at number two on the US Billboard 200 with 89,000 album-equivalent units, including 10,000 pure album sales. It is the Weeknd's highest charting compilation album, and marks the biggest first week debut for a greatest hits set since Blake Shelton's Fully Loaded: God's Country (2019), which peaked at number two on the chart dated December 28, 2019. The compilation album has managed to spend more than 100 weeks on the chart.

Track listing

Notes
 signifies a co-producer
 denotes a vocal producer
 signifies an additional producer

Charts

Weekly charts

Year-end charts

Certifications

Release history

References

External links
 

2021 greatest hits albums
Republic Records compilation albums
The Weeknd albums